The 1958 Australian Grand Prix was a motor race for Formula Libre racing cars, held at the Mount Panorama Circuit, near Bathurst in New South Wales, Australia on 6 October 1958.  The race had 26 starters. It was the first Australian Grand Prix to specifically exclude sports cars from the entry.

The race was the 23rd Australian Grand Prix and the seventh race of the 1958 Australian Drivers' Championship.

Lex Davison won his third AGP, equalling the record held jointly by Bill Thompson and Doug Whiteford.

Classification 
Results as follows.

'# New Zealander Merv Neal was not eligible to score points in the Australian Drivers Championship

1958 Australian Drivers' Championship standings after the race 
The top five standings in the 1958 Australian Drivers' Championship after the Australian Grand Prix were:

Notes & references

Grand Prix
Australian Grand Prix
Motorsport in Bathurst, New South Wales
Australian Grand Prix